Community Christian School (CCS) is a private Christian school located in Tallahassee, Florida for grades K–12. According to its website site, tuition in 2017–2018 was $7,990 per year.

Athletics 
The athletics at CCS include cross-country, women's court volleyball, and swimming in the fall; soccer and basketball in the winter; and track and field, tennis, and women's sand volleyball in the spring. The school also has intramural sports.

Intramural 
In elementary, the students can participate in intramural sports including flag-football, soccer, and T-ball. The middle- and high-schoolers also have a sand volleyball intramural.

Academics 
CCS offers a speech class for juniors. In speech class, students research a Biblical perspective of world events and prepare a speech that is performed in the auditorium.

Leadership program 

The leadership program leads high school students through community service, survival skills, learning independence, and the pursuit of a relationship with God. The students are taken on a number of events throughout the year including the biannual Senior and Junior trip to Panama City, Panama and the biannual trip to the Navajo Nation in Arizona.

References

External links
 School's website

Christian schools in Florida
Private schools in Florida
High schools in Leon County, Florida